Kalateh-ye Hajji Yusof (also Romanized as Kalāteh-ye Ḩājjī Yūsof; also known as Kalāteh-ye Ḩājjī Yūsof Khān, Kalāteh Hāji Khān, Kalateh Haji Yoosef Khan, and Kalāteh-ye Ḩājjī Khān) is a village in Baqeran Rural District, in the Central District of Birjand County, South Khorasan Province, Iran. At the 2006 census, its population was 64, in 16 families.

References 

Populated places in Birjand County